Attackers FC is an Anguillian football club based in The Valley-North.

In the 2012–13 season, the club won the AFA Senior League, the top tier of Anguillian football.

Honours
Anguillian League: 4
 1998–99, 2007–08, 2008–09, 2012–13

References

External links
Club profile – Footballzz.co.uk
Club profile – Footballdatabase.eu
Club profile – Soccerway.com

Football clubs in Anguilla
The Valley, Anguilla